Billie Joe may refer to:
Billie Joe Armstrong (born 1972), lead vocalist for Green Day
"Ode to Billie Joe", a 1967 song written and recorded by Bobbie Gentry
Ode to Billie Joe (album), Bobbie Gentry's debut album released in 1967
Murder of Billie-Jo Jenkins

See also
 Billy Joe (disambiguation)